The 1951 NASCAR Grand National season was the third season of professional stock car racing in the United States. Beginning at the Daytona Beach Road Course on February 5, 1951, the season included forty-one races. The season concluded at New Mobile Speedway on November 25. Herb Thomas won the Drivers' Championship with a 21st-place finish at the final race of the season.

Schedule
The schedule more than doubled for the 1951 season, increasing to 41 races. 32 different circuits in 14 different states held races. Race 1951–04 was the first race held west of the Mississippi River; five races were held in California, in addition to one race held in Arizona. The Southern 500 and the Motor City 250 had the largest purses and therefore awarded the highest points.

Race summaries

1951–01 
The first race of the 1951 season was run on February 5 at the Daytona Beach Road Course in Daytona Beach, Florida. Tim Flock won the pole position.

Top ten results

6-Marshall Teague
91-Tim Flock
14-Fonty Flock
41.5-Bill Blair
87-Buck Baker
55-Lee Snow
41-Curtis Turner
16-Bill Snowden
98-Johnny Mantz
59-Lloyd Moore

1951–02 
The second race of the 1951 season was held on April 1 at the Charlotte Speedway. Fonty Flock won the pole

Top ten results

41-Curtis Turner
42-Lee Petty
6-Marshall Teague
92-Herb Thomas
88-Frank Luptow
72-Weldon Adams
77-Ewell Weddie
11-Fireball Roberts
19-Joe Merola
10-Jim Fiebelkorn

1951–03 
The third race of the 1951 season was held on April 8 at the Lakeview Speedway in Mobile, Alabama. Red Harrelson won the pole

Top ten results

91-Tim Flock
14-Fonty Flock
92-Herb Thomas
9-Bill Osbourne
93-Donald Thomas
19-Lamar Crabtree
42-Lee Petty
7-Bob Flock
8-Sonny Black
3-Jimmy Ayers

1951–04 
The fourth race of the 1951 season was held on April 8 at the Carrell Speedway in Gardena, California. It was the first NASCAR race ever staged west of the Mississippi River. Andy Pierce won the pole.

Top ten results

6-Marshall Teague
98-Johnny Mantz
George Seeger
16-Fred Steinbroner
1-Erick Erickson
9-Dick Meyer
Dick Rathman
Danny Letner
Leo Breithaupt
22-Lloyd Dane

1951–05 
The fifth race of the 1951 season was held on April 15 at the Occoneechee Speedway. Fonty Flock won the pole. The race ended after 95 laps due to rain.

Top ten results

14-Fonty Flock
23-Frank Mundy
41.5-Bill Blair
91-Tim Flock
52-Neil Cole
110-Earl Moss
92-Herb Thomas
71-Jim Paschal
42-Lee Petty
55-Glenn Dunaway

1951–06 
The sixth race of the 1951 season was held on April 22 at the Arizona State Fairgrounds in Phoenix, Arizona. Fonty Flock won the pole.

Top ten results

6-Marshall Teague
11-Erick Erickson
91-Tim Flock
14-Fonty Flock
9-Dick Meyer
12-Danny Weinberg
1-Walt Sprague
Bill Holland
26-Leland Colvin
18-Bill Stammer

Wilkes County 150 
The seventh race of the 1951 season was held on April 29 at the North Wilkesboro Speedway. Fonty Flock won the pole

Top ten results

14-Fonty Flock
91-Tim Flock
42-Lee Petty
98-Bill Holland
93-Donald Thomas
59-Lloyd Moore
60-Jimmie Lewallen
155-Glenn Dunaway
5-Dale Williams
83-Jimmy Ayers

1951–08 
The eight race of the 1951 season was held on May 6 at the Martinsville Speedway. Tim Flock won the pole.

Top ten results

41-Curtis Turner
23-Frank Mundy
91-Tim Flock
92-Herb Thomas
14-Fonty Flock
42-Lee Petty
1-Walt Sprague
2-Bill Blair
26-Leland Colvin
7-Bob Flock

Poor Man's 500 
The ninth race of the 1951 season was held on May 30 at the Canfield Speedway. Bill Rexford won the pole.

Top ten results

6-Marshall Teague
91-Tim Flock
14-Fonty Flock
92-Herb Thomas
42-Lee Petty
7-Bob Flock
23-Frank Mundy
77-Mike Klapak
120-Dick Rathmann
6-Don Eggett

1951–10 
The tenth race of the 1951 season was held on June 10 at the Columbus Speedway in Columbus, Georgia. Gober Sosebee won the pole. During the first caution, Marshall Teague suffered a leg injury when his car was hit in the side near the back straightaway by Fireball Roberts.

Top ten results

91-Tim Flock
51-Gober Sosebee
92-Herb Thomas
60-Jim Paschal
42-Lee Petty
22-Red Byron
93-Donald Thomas
23-Frank Mundy
83-Jimmy Ayers
4-Ed Massey

1951–11 
The eleventh race of the 1951 season was held on June 16 at the Columbia Speedway in Columbia, South Carolina. Frank Mundy won the pole.

Top ten results
23-Frank Mundy
98-Bill Blair
6-Marshall Teague
92-Herb Thomas
87-Buck Baker
60-Jim Paschal
91-Tim Flock
16-Bill Snowden
72-Weldon Adams
Jim Harris

1951–12 
The twelfth race of the 1951 season was held on June 24 at the Dayton Speedway. Tim Flock won the pole.

Top ten results
41-Curtis Turner
120-Dick Rathmann
91-Tim Flock
14-Fonty Flock
59-Lloyd Moore
6-Marshall Teague
1-Walt Sprague
Bub King
60-Don Eggett
Red Harvey

1951–13 
The thirteenth race of the 1951 season was held on June 30 at the Carrell Speedway. Lou Figaro won the pole.

Top ten results
33-Lou Figaro
7-Chuck Meekins
22-Lloyd Dane
11-Fred Bince
16-Fred Steinbroner
1-Erick Erickson
Hal Cole
98-Freddie Farmer
18-Bill Stammer
27-Jim Byrd

1951–14 
The fourteenth race of the 1951 season was held on July 1 at the Grand River Speedrome in Grand Rapids, Michigan. Marshall Teague won the pole.

Top ten results
6-Marshall Teague
120-Dick Rathmann
14-Fonty Flock
91-Tim Flock
59-Lloyd Moore
42-Lee Petty
23-Frank Mundy
27-Jimmy Florian
Quinton Daniels
Tommy Lane

1951–15 
The fifteenth race of the 1951 season was held on July 8 at the Bainbridge Speedway in Bainbridge, Ohio. Fonty Flock won the pole.

 Top ten results
14-Fonty Flock
120-Dick Rathmann
23-Frank Mundy
27-Jimmy Florian
22-Oda Greene
42-Lee Petty
10-Jim Fiebelkorn
Norm McCarthy
Lyle Scott
Jim Romine

1951–16 
The sixteenth race of the 1951 season was held on July 15 at the Heidelberg Raceway. Fonty Flock won the pole. A six-car crash on the 21st lap took Flock out of the race, and let Herb Thomas inherit the lead. The crash left Wally Campbell hospitalized and Flock with a cut over his eye, though he continued racing. Thomas led the remaining 179 laps and went on to win his first race of the season, over a lap ahead of second-place Firbelkorn.

Top ten results
92-Herb Thomas
10-Jim Fiebelkorn
Augie Walackas
Bud Farrell
Tom Jerris
Jack Flynn
Bob Dietrich
Dick Moffitt
Harry Scott
Charles Gillman

1951–17 
The seventeenth race of the 1951 season was held on July 29 at the Asheville-Weaverville Speedway. Fonty Flock won the pole.

Top ten results
14-Fonty Flock
51-Gober Sosebee
92-Herb Thomas
23-Frank Mundy
Speedy Thompson
Bub King
217-Bill Miller
Billy Myers
16-Bill Snowden
7-Bob Flock

1951–18 
The eighteenth race of the 1951 season was held on July 31 at the Monroe County Fairgrounds in Rochester, New York. Fonty Flock won the pole.

Top ten results
42-Lee Petty
Charles Gattalia
Ronnie Kohler
54-Don Bailey
81-Pappy Hough
60-Bill Rexford
Chuck Stimus
93-Ted Chamberlain
Ernie Yorton
25-Dick Linder

1951–19 
The nineteenth race of the 1951 season was held on August 1 at the Altamont-Schenectady Fairgrounds. Fonty Flock won the pole.

Top ten results
14-Fonty Flock
92-Herb Thomas
42-Lee Petty
23-Perry Smith
227-Jerry Morese
81-Pappy Hough
Dick Moffitt
Wimpy Ervin
Jim Little
25-Dick Linder

Motor City 250 
The twentieth race of the 1951 season was held on August 12 at the Michigan State Fairgrounds Speedway. Marshall Teague won the pole. This race had five cautions including nine cars with mechanical problems and a 10-car wreck on lap 130. The race ended with 21 cars on the lead lap. Late in the race leaders Curtis Turner and Tommy Thompson tangled. Thompson went on to win while Turner finished ninth.

Top ten results
40-Tommy Thompson
82-Joe Eubanks
98-Johnny Mantz
83-Red Byron
43-Paul Newkirk
34-Jack Goodwin
59-Lloyd Moore
50-Ewell Weddie
41-Curtis Turner
1-X-Erick Erickson

1951–21 
The twenty-first race of the 1951 season was held on August 19 at the newly-surfaced Fort Miami Speedway in Toledo, Ohio. Fonty Flock won the pole. This was the first NASCAR Grand National race held at this .500 mile dirt track. The track was removed from the schedule until at least 1952.

Top ten results
91-Tim Flock
88-Dell Pearson
22-Oda Greene
33-Lou Figaro
92-Herb Thomas
40-Tommy Thompson
31-Jesse James Taylor
18-George Seeger
27-Jimmy Florian
3-Jimmy Ayers

1951–22 
The twenty-second race of the 1951 season was held on August 24 at the Morristown Speedway. Tim Flock won the pole.

Top ten results
91-Tim Flock
42-Lee Petty
Ronnie Kohler
John DuBoise
21-Jim Delaney
421-Jack Reynolds
22-Oda Greene
Dick Eagan
77-Chuck Mahoney
Augie Walackas

1951–23 
The twenty-third race of the 1951 season was held on August 25 at the Air Base Speedway in Greenville, South Carolina. Tim Flock won the pole.

Top ten results
7-Bob Flock
91-Tim Flock
87-Buck Baker
14-Fonty Flock
1-X-Erick Erickson
92-Herb Thomas
42-Lee Petty
31-Jesse James Taylor
120-Dick Rathmann
17-Buddy Shuman

Southern 500 

The second running of this race and the twenty-fourth race of the 1951 season was held on September 3 at the Darlington Raceway. Frank Mundy won the pole. The race featured an 82-car field. This was Red Byron's last career start.

Top ten results
92-Herb Thomas
31-Jesse James Taylor
17-Buddy Schuman
77-Hershel McGriff
11-Fireball Roberts
1-Harold Kite
46-Leon Sales
14-Fonty Flock
16-Bill Snowden
24-Pap White

1951–25 
The twenty-fifth race of the 1951 season was held on September 7 at the Columbia Speedway. Tim Flock won the pole.

Top ten results
91-Tim Flock
11-Fireball Roberts
0-Jimmie Lewallen
7-Bob Flock
87-Buck Baker
93-Donald Thomas
71-Cotton Owens
70-Bud Farrell
16-Bill Snowden
14-Fonty Flock

1951–26 
The twenty-sixth race of the 1951 season was held on September 8 at the Central City Speedway. Bob Flock won the pole.

Top ten results
91-Herb Thomas
51-Gober Sosebee
60-Jim Paschal
14-Fonty Flock
93-Donald Thomas
71-Cotton Owens
38-Frank Gise
8-Billy Carden
Bill Miller
Augie Walackas

1951–27 
The twenty-seventh race of the 1951 season was held on September 15 at the Langhorne Speedway. Fonty Flock won the pole.

Top ten results
91-Herb Thomas
14-Fonty Flock
21-Dick Rathmann
120-John McGinley
91-Tim Flock
6-Marshall Teague
67-Jim Fiebelkorn
66-Bud Riley
42-Lee Petty
2-Bill Blair

1951–28 
The twenty-eight race of the 1951 season was held on September 23 at the Charlotte Speedway. Billy Carden won the pole.

Top ten results
92-Herb Thomas
90-Shorty York
93-Donald Thomas
2-Bill Blair
0-Jimmie Lewallen
17-Buddy Shuman
8-Billy Carden
88-Dell Pearson
60-Jim Paschal
53-Clyde Minter

1951–29 
The twenty-ninth race of the 1951 season was held on September 23 at the Dayton Speedway. Fonty Flock won the pole.

Top ten results
14-Fonty Flock
52-Neil Cole
59-Lloyd Moore
42-Lee Petty
66-Bud Riley
Ronnie Kohler
Jimmy Florian
54-Don Bailey
89-Herb Trimble
Bill Braun

1951–30 
The thirtieth race of the 1951 season was held on September 30 at the newly .500 mile dirt track Wilson Speedway. Fonty Flock won the pole.

Top ten results
14-Fonty Flock
7-Bob Flock
0-Jimmie Lewallen
60-Jim Paschal
16-Bill Snowden
87-Buck Baker
Cal Johnson
99-Leonard Tippett
Bill Champion
93-Donald Thomas

1951–31 
The thirty-first race of the 1951 season was held on October 7 at the one-mile dirt Occoneechee Speedway. Herb Thomas won his first career pole.

Top ten results
92-Herb Thomas
99-Leonard Tippett
82-Joe Eubanks
60-Jim Paschal
42-Lee Petty
93-Donald Thomas
Furman Lancaster
Alton Haddock
2-Bill Blair
37-Coleman Lawrence

1951–32 
The thirty-second race of the 1951 season was held on October 12 at the half-mile paved Thompson Speedway in Connecticut. Neil Cole won the pole.

Top ten results
52-Neil Cole
67-Jim Reed
Dick Eagan
8-Billy Carden
32-Reino Tulonen
81-Pappy Hough
91-Tim Flock
Joe Sommers
Bill Cintia
21-Jim Delaney

1951–33 
The thirty-third race of the 1951 season was held on October 14 at the half-mile dirt Pine Grove Speedway in Pennsylvania.

Top ten results
91-Tim Flock
120-John McGinley
8-Billy Carden
Jimmy Florian
59-Lloyd Moore
Hap Jones
Ed Benedict
Bob Dietrich
Russ Hepler
Dick Stone

1951–34 
The thirty-fourth race of the 1951 season was held on October 14 at the half-mile dirt Martinsville Speedway in Virginia. Herb Thomas won the pole.

Top ten results
7-Frank Mundy
42-Lee Petty
22-Billy Myers
16-Bill Snowden
0-Jimmie Lewallen
Pappy Hough
37-Coleman Lawrence
98-Leon Sales
88-Dell Pearson
Cal Johnson

1951–35 
The thirty-fifth race of the 1951 season was held on October 14 at the .625 mile dirt Oakland Stadium in California. Dick Rathman won the pole.

Top ten results
18-Marvin Burke
84-Robert Caswell
Woody Brown
55-Sam Hawks
9-Dick Meyer
56-Marvin Panch
33-Lou Figaro
Bill Norton
John Soares
Walt Davis
Burke remains the only driver in NASCAR history to win in his only start.

Wilkes 200 
The third running of this race and the thirty-sixth race of the 1951 season was held on October 21 at the .625 mile dirt North Wilkesboro Speedway in North Carolina. Herb Thomas won the pole.

Top ten results
14-Fonty Flock
42-Lee Petty
82-Joe Eubanks
91-Tim Flock
71-Cotton Owens
16-Bill Snowden
0-Jimmie Lewallen
17-Buddy Schuman
Jerry Wimbish
7-Bob Flock

1951–37 
The thirty-seventh race of the 1951 season was held on October 28 at the half-mile dirt Marchbanks Speedway in California. Dick Rathman won the pole.

Top ten results
2-Danny Weinberg
56-Marvin Panch
Bill Norton
22-Lloyd Dane
Woody Brown
Claude Wallington
7-Fred Bince
Fred Russell
Pug Blalock
16-Fred Steinbroner

1951–38 
The thirty-eighth race of the 1951 season was held on November 4 at the half-mile dirt Jacksonville Speedway Park in Florida. Herb Thomas won the pole.

Top ten results
6-Herb Thomas
44-Jack Smith
14-Fonty Flock
16-Bill Snowden
23-Frank Mundy
Tommy Moon
42-Lee Petty
0-Jimmie Lewallen
17-Buddy Shuman
8-Billy Carden

1951–39 
The thirty-ninth race of the 1951 season was held on November 11 at the one-mile dirt Lakeview Speedway in Georgia. Frank Mundy won the pole.

Top ten results
91-Tim Flock
7-Bob Flock
44X-Jack Smith
23-Frank Mundy
51-Gober Sosebee
Ed Samples
59-Lloyd Moore
17-Buddy Shuman
Red Duvall
Don Oldenberg

1951–40 
The fortieth race of the 1951 season was held on November 11 at the half-mile dirt Carrell Speedway in California. Fonty Flock won the pole.

Top ten results
48-Bill Norton
9-Dick Meyer
25-Erick Erickson
33-Lou Figaro
Danny Weinberg
6-Bill Ledbetter
77-Burt Jackson
98-Johnny Mantz
36-Danny Letner
Walt Davis

1951–41 
The forty-first and last race of the 1951 season was held on November 25 at the .750 mile dirt New Mobile Speedway. Frank Mundy won the pole. Herb Thomas finished 21st and went home as 1951 NASCAR Grand National champion. Fonty and Tim Flock finished fourth and second respectively to eventually finish second and third in the championship, and their brother Bob Flock got in a massive accident and broke his neck when his roof collapsed. Mundy's win at New Mobile propelled him to fifth in the final standings, while Lee Petty, winner of just one race, at the Monroe County Fairgrounds, finished 16th in the race to claim fourth in the standings.

Top ten results
23-Frank Mundy
91-Tim Flock
87-Red Duvall
14-Fonty Flock
142-Don Oldenberg
20-Buddy Shuman
51-Gober Sosebee
9-Ed Samples
24-Jimmie Lewallen
80-Sonny Black

Results and standings

Races

Drivers' championship 

(key) Bold - Pole position * – Most laps led.

References 

Racing Reference

 
NASCAR Cup Series seasons